The Bruges derby is a local football rivalry between two Belgian Pro League clubs Club Brugge and Cercle Brugge, who share the Jan Breydel Stadium in Bruges, Belgium.

The derby was first contested during the 1899–1900 season however the results of this season have been lost. The first known result was the following season in November 1900 and finished 0–0. The return fixture that season ended 2–2 but Cercle won the next five games before Club recorded their first victory with a 5–0 in October 1904. It would be the start of Club Brugge's dominance as they went on to win 13 of the next 19 pre-War fixtures, losing only 2. 
Cercle Brugge were the more successful side of the two before the Second World War winning three championships and one cup to Club Brugge solitary championship. 
Since the 1970s Club Brugge have become one of the most successful sides in Belgium winning a further 12 championships and a record 10 Cups while Cercle have only added 3 more cups since, because of this many Club Brugge fans now see Anderlecht as their main rival. In the derby Club Brugge maintains a dramatically superior record often winning many consecutive games and have also recorded many high-scoring wins such as 8–1 in 1981 and their biggest ever victory against any opposition with a 10–0 win in 1991.

The derby is notable as for many years it was the only city-based derby regularly played in Belgium. Cities such as Antwerp, Brussels, and Liège had two or more successful sides but many of these had gone out of existence or play outside the top flight. Since 2020, the Antwerp derby is again regularly played as both Antwerp and Beerschot are now in the top flight together, and in 2021, both Union SG and Seraing got promoted to the highest level, resulting again in regular derbies as well in Brussels (Anderlecht vs Union SG) and Liège (Standard Liège vs Seraing).

Head-to-head

All-time results

League

Cup

Records

Trends
Most games won in a row (Club Brugge): 11, 7 September 1983 to 31 January 1988.
Most games won in a row (Cercle Brugge): 5, 24 November 1901 to 18 October 1903.
Most home games won in a row (Club Brugge): 8, 7 September 1983 to 27 January 1991
Most home games won in a row (Cercle Brugge): 3, 19 November 1922 to 25 January 1925
Most away games won in a row (Club Brugge): 7, 17 October to 27 November 2005
Most away games won in a row (Cercle Brugge): 4, 22 November 1925 to 22 December 1930
Most games without defeat (Club Brugge): 17, 22 October 1972 to 14 February 1981. (including 15 victories)
Most games without defeat (Cercle Brugge): 8, 4 November 1900 to 24 January 1904. (including 5 victories) 
Most home games without defeat (Club Brugge): 16, 9 October 1904 to 12 October 1924. (including 11 victories)
Most home games without defeat (Cercle Brugge): 10, 1926–27 season to 13 February 1949. (including 3 victories)
Most away games without defeat (Club Brugge): 15, 22 October 1972 to 31 January 1988. (including 13 victories)
Most away games without defeat (Cercle Brugge): 5, 12 October 1924 to 22 December 1930. (including 4 victories)

Results
Biggest win (Club Brugge): 10–0, 17 January 1991
Biggest win (Cercle Brugge): 4–0, 9 January 1910.
Highest scoring game: 10–0, 17 January 1991 and 5–5, 24 May 1992.
Number of seasons in which won home and away fixture (Club Brugge): 29
Number of seasons in which won home and away fixture (Cercle Brugge): 5
Number of clean sheets kept (Club Brugge): 59
Number of clean sheets kept (Cercle Brugge): 19

Goalscorers

Titles by team

External links 
Official Club Brugge Web Site
Official Cercle Brugge Web Site

References

Club Brugge KV
Cercle Brugge K.S.V.
Football rivalries in Belgium
Sport in Bruges